Mastigoteuthis is a genus of whip-lash squid containing at least seven valid species. Some teuthologists consider Idioteuthis synonymous with this taxon.

The genus contains bioluminescent species.

Species
Genus Mastigoteuthis
Mastigoteuthis agassizii Verrill, 1881
Mastigoteuthis dentata Hoyle, 1904
Mastigoteuthis flammea Chun, 1908
Mastigoteuthis glaukopis Chun, 1908
Mastigoteuthis grimaldii (Joubin, 1895)
Mastigoteuthis psychrophila Nesis, 1977
Mastigoteuthis schmidti Degner, 1925
Mastigoteuthis hastula * (Berry, 1920)
Mastigoteuthis inermis * Rancurel, 1972
Mastigoteuthis iselini * MacDonald & Clench, 1934 
Mastigoteuthis okutanii * Salcedo-Vargas, 1997
Mastigoteuthis tyroi * Salcedo-Vargas, 1997

Magnapinna talismani was previously placed in this genus, but is now considered a species of bigfin squid.

The taxa listed above with an asterisk (*) are taxon inquirendum and need further study to determine if they are a valid taxon or a synonym.

References
Notes

Sources
Salcedo-Vargas, M.A. 1997. Cephalopods from the Netherlands Indian Ocean Programme (NIOP) - II. Mastigoteuthid lineage and related forms. Beaufortia 47: 91-108.

External links
 Tree of Life: Mastigoteuthis

 
Cephalopod genera
Bioluminescent molluscs